Salt City is an Indian Hindi-language family-drama web television series which was premiered on SonyLIV, on 16 June 2022. It is produced by Applause Entertainment & Sunshine Productions and directed by Rishabh Anupam Sahay.

Cast
 Piyush Mishra as Harish Bajpai
 Divyenndu as Saurabh Bajpai
 Gauahar Khan as Gunjan Bajpai
 Navni Parihar as Triveni Bajpai
 Manish Anand  as Aman Bajpai
 Pranay Pachauri as Nikhil Bajpai
 Jitin Gulati as Sukesh Sood
 Vinita Joshi as Sulekha Gaitonde
 Nivedita Bhattacharya as Vibha
 Monica Chaudhary as Ela Bajpai

Synopsis

Salt City traces the journey of the Bajpai family, through the pressures that life in a big city puts on their relationships. The story revolves around 5 siblings & how their lives cross each others, exposing their past and unfolding their future. Their journeys make them realise their bitter realities, motivating them to confront it without fear and get closer to themselves.

Release

Web television series which was premiered on SonyLIV, on 16 June 2022.

References

External links
 
 Salt City On SonyLIV

2022 Indian television series debuts
2022 web series debuts
Hindi-language web series
Indian drama web series
SonyLIV original films